The South Africa women's cricket team played the West Indies women's cricket team in August and September 2021. The tour consisted of five Women's One Day Internationals (WODIs) and three Women's Twenty20 Internationals (WT20Is). The WODI matches were used as the West Indies' preparation for the 2021 Women's Cricket World Cup Qualifier tournament.

The first WT20I match ended as a no result due to rain. South Africa then won the second WT20I match by 50 runs, with the West Indies winning the third match by five wickets, with the series being drawn 1–1. In the first two WODI matches, South Africa recorded big wins, of eight and nine wickets respectively, taking a 2–0 lead in the series. South Africa won the third WODI by eight wickets to win the series with two matches to play. South Africa also won the fourth WODI to take a 4–0 lead in the series. The final match ended in a tie, with the West Indies winning the Super Over. Therefore, South Africa won the five-match series 4–1.

Squads

South Africa did not name individual squads for the WODI and WT20I matches, opting instead to name a combined squad of 18 players for the tour. Cricket West Indies (CWI) named Anisa Mohammed as the captain for the WT20I matches, after Stafanie Taylor was ruled out due to being a close contact of someone with COVID-19. For the third WT20I match, CWI announced that Cherry-Ann Fraser and Karishma Ramharack had been added to the squad, replacing Shamilia Connell and Shakera Selman. CWI also named Anisa Mohammed as the WODI captain, after Stafanie Taylor was unavailable after returning home. The West Indies added Shakera Selman and Rashada Williams to their WODI squad ahead of the third match, and Britney Cooper was ruled out of the rest of the series due to a medical reason. Reniece Boyce, Cherry-Ann Fraser and Sheneta Grimmond were added to the West Indies' squad for the fourth WODI, with Qiana Joseph, Chedean Nation, and Karishma Ramharack all being rested. Deandra Dottin captained the West Indies for the fifth WODI, after Anisa Mohammed was ruled out of the match with a fractured finger.

WT20I series

1st WT20I

2nd WT20I

3rd WT20I

WODI series

1st WODI

2nd WODI

3rd WODI

4th WODI

5th WODI

Notes

References

External links
 Series home at ESPN Cricinfo

South Africa 2021
West Indies 2021
International cricket competitions in 2021
2021 in South African cricket
2021 in West Indian cricket
2021 in women's cricket